The 1995 Champion Hurdle was a horse race held at Cheltenham Racecourse on Tuesday 14 March 1995. It was the 66th running of the Champion Hurdle.

The winner was Ernie Pick's Alderbrook, a six-year-old bay stallion trained in Gloucestershire by Kim Bailey and ridden by Norman Williamson. Alderbrook's victory was a first in the race for jockey, trainer and owner.

Alderbrook was a top-class flat racer, who won the Group Three Select Stakes and finished second in the Group One Prix Ganay. The Champion Hurdle was his third race under National Hunt rules after an unplaced run in a novice hurdle in 1992 and a win in the Kingwell Hurdle nineteen days before the championship. Starting at odds of 11/2 he won the Champion Hurdle by five lengths and two lengths from the joint-favourites Large Action and Danoli. The only previous winner of the race to take part was Granville Again who finished last. Twelve of the fourteen runners completed the course.

Race details
 Sponsor: Smurfit
 Purse: £172,792; First prize: £103,690
 Going: Soft
 Distance: 2 miles 110 yards
 Number of runners: 14
 Winner's time: 4m 03.10

Full result

 Abbreviations: nse = nose; nk = neck; hd = head; dist = distance; UR = unseated rider; PU = pulled up; LFT = left at start; SU = slipped up; BD = brought down

Winner's details
Further details of the winner, Alderbrook
 Sex: Stallion
 Foaled: 27 April 1989
 Country: United Kingdom
 Sire: Ardross; Dam: Twine (Thatching)
 Owner: Ernie Pick
 Breeder: J. H. Stone

References

Champion Hurdle
 1995
Champion Hurdle
Champion Hurdle
1990s in Gloucestershire